Shagey is a village comprising more than 250 houses, spurs included. On the eastern spurs of the Konsh Valley of Khyber-Pakhtunkhwa province of Pakistan, two kilometers from the Chattar Plain. The village was also severely jolted by the 8th of October's earthquake 2005. The significant clans are Manshais, Khazan khels and Khan khails of the Swati division.

Villages in Khyber Pakhtunkhwa